Ornithogalum arabicum is a species of star of Bethlehem native to northern Africa and southern Europe. Common names include Arab's eye, lesser cape-lily, and Arabian starflower.

References 

arabicum
Flora of Europe
Plants described in 1753
Taxa named by Carl Linnaeus